The 1897 Navy Midshipmen football team represented the United States Naval Academy during the 1897 college football season. In their first season under head coach Bill Armstrong, the Midshipmen compiled an 8–1 record, shut out seven opponents, and outscored all opponents by a combined score of 111 to 34. The Army–Navy Game was canceled due to Presidential cabinet order.

Schedule

References

Navy
Navy Midshipmen football seasons
Navy Midshipmen football